Onzonilla is a municipality located in the province of León, Castile and León, Spain. At the 2011 census (INE), the municipality had a population of 1,761 inhabitants.

References

Municipalities in the Province of León